Panicale is a comune (municipality) in the Province of Perugia in the Italian region Umbria. Located on the eastern slope of Mount Petrarvella, in the southeast of Valdichiana, it overlooks Lake Trasimeno and it is about 35 km far from Perugia.

As of 31 December 2012, it had a population of 5,669 and an area of 78.8 km².

The municipality of Panicale contains the frazioni (subdivisions, mainly villages and hamlets) Tavernelle, Colle San Paolo, Missiano, Casalini, Colle Calzolaro, Macereto, Mongiovino, Montale, Colgiordano, Gioveto and Migliaiolo.

Panicale borders the following municipalities: Castiglione del Lago, Magione, Paciano, Perugia and Piegaro.

Main sights 

 Church of Saint Sebastian, contains Pietro Perugino's Fresco The Martyrdom of Saint Sebastian (1505)
 Teatro Caporali

Demographic evolution

References

External links
 Official Site

Panicale